Abercamlais railway station was a private platform serving the Abercamlais estate in the traditional county of Brecknockshire, Wales.

History

Opened by the Neath and Brecon Railway Railway in 1867, it became part of the Great Western Railway during the Grouping of 1923. The line then passed on to the Western Region of British Railways on nationalisation in 1948. It was then closed by the British Transport Commission in 1962.

References 

 Abercamlais station on navigable O. S. map

Disused railway stations in Powys
Railway stations in Great Britain opened in 1867
Railway stations in Great Britain closed in 1962
Former Great Western Railway stations